Kung sarong is a Thai dish which contains deep fried prawns wrapped in egg noodles.

Etymology 
Kung means "prawns" (or shrimp) and sarong, loosely translates as "wrapped around something." In this context, note that a sarong is a cloth wrapped around the waist.

Ingredients 
In addition to eggs, rice vermicelli, and prawns, coriander, garlic, black pepper and salt are used according to taste.

Serving 
Kung sarong are usually eaten as appetizers with chili sauce or plum sauce.

See also 

 Kung hom pha

References 

Thai cuisine